Valley View is an unincorporated community in Jackson Township in Sainte Genevieve County, Missouri, United States.

References

Unincorporated communities in Ste. Genevieve County, Missouri
Unincorporated communities in Missouri